Garry Scollard (died 2000) was a Gaelic footballer and hurler from the Austin Stacks club in Tralee, County Kerry, Ireland. He was a member of the Austin Stacks team that won the 1977 All-Ireland Senior Club Football Championship, and of the Kerry county hurling team that won the 1976 All-Ireland Senior B Hurling Championship. Scollard was paralysed following a car accident in 1978. He died in February 2000, and an under-16 hurling competition was subsequently named the Gary Scollard Memorial Tournament.

References

Year of birth missing
2000 deaths
Austin Stacks Gaelic footballers
Austin Stacks hurlers
Dual players
Kerry inter-county hurlers